Electric Outlet is a studio album by jazz guitarist John Scofield. Featured musicians include alto saxophonist David Sanborn, trombonist Ray Anderson and keyboardist Pete Levin. Scofield also plays bass guitar.

Track listing

Personnel
 John Scofield – electric guitar, bass guitar
 Ray Anderson – trombone
 David Sanborn – saxophone
 Pete Levin – keyboards
 Steve Jordan – drums

References 

1984 albums
Post-bop albums
John Scofield albums
Gramavision Records albums